Argentine passports are issued to citizens of Argentina by the National Registry for People (ReNaPer). They were issued exclusively by the Argentine Federal Police up to 2011.  Their primary use is to facilitate international travel.

Argentine passports are valid for travel all over the world, but some countries require a visa. For traveling within South America (except the Guyanas), Argentines do not need to use a passport, as they may use their National Identity Document (DNI).

On June 15, 2012, the Argentine Interior Ministry announced the immediate introduction of biometric passports. The new passports have unique numbers (alphanumerical combinations, with 3 letters and 6 numbers), a significant change from the previous policy, where passport numbers were the national ID number of the holders (with an N after it). Since December 2012, all new Argentine passports are biometric passports.

As of 11 January 2022, Argentine citizens had visa-free or visa on arrival access to 170 countries and territories, ranking the Argentine passport 19th in terms of travel freedom. The Argentine passport is the 2nd most powerful passport in Latin America after the Chilean passport and is the 4th most powerful overall in the Americas, according to the Henley Passport Index.

Bureaucracy 

In accordance with Presidential Decree 2015–66, in order to get an Argentine passport, a person must go to the nearest Civil Registry and present his/her National Identity Document, birth certificate and a proof of marital status (unless single). If the person is an Argentine citizen by naturalisation rather than by birth, a Citizenship Certificate (carta de ciudadanía) must also be presented. Citizens under the age of 18 may only get a passport with parental authorization. Argentines living outside the country must follow the same procedure at an Argentine Embassy or Consulate.

Regular Passport price is 550 ARS. Applicants usually receive their passports via postal mail within 15 days. There is an express service (48 hours) for 1250 ARS and an ultrafast passport for 3675 ARS (550 ARS + 200 US$), only available at Ministro Pistarini International Airport in Buenos Aires, with the possibility of getting a passport in only 15 minutes, if there are any proofs (as a printed ticket) of an international flight for that same day.

Since January 2011, in all cases, Argentine passports are valid for 10 years. Beforehand, they were valid only for 5-year periods.

Passports are not issued to persons who are under arrest because of criminal offenses, or to those labeled 'dangerous' as per the South American Police Agreement of 1920.

Regular passport 
In accordance with Mercosur regulations, it is blue-covered, with the legend MERCOSUR written on its top, followed by the country's name in Spanish (REPÚBLICA ARGENTINA), the national coat of arms and the word PASAPORTE (Passport). A biometric passport has the e-passport symbol at the bottom.

It has a data page with a machine-readable zone and a digital photograph of the passport holder. All the information is written in Spanish and English.

 Photograph
 Type of document (P for Passport)
 Country code (ARG)
 Passport number
 Surname
 Given names
 Nationality 
 Date of Birth
 DNI number (known officially in English as “personal number”)
 Gender
 Place of Birth (Province and country code)
 Issuing date
 Expiration date
 Signature
 Fingerprint

The previous version also included:
 Passport copy (i.e. number of passports the bearer had before the current one)
 Marital Status
 Police-registry Number

A map of South America appears on the back of Argentine passports, showing the country's location within the continent, with the Falkland Islands and the Argentine Antarctic Claim (Antártida Argentina).

Passport message 
Passports of many countries contain a message addressed to authorities of other countries identifying the bearer as a citizen of the issuing country, requesting that he or she be allowed to enter and pass through the other country, and requesting that, when necessary, he or she be given assistance consistent with international norms. In Argentine passports, the message is in Spanish, English, Portuguese and French. The message is:

In Spanish:
En nombre del Gobierno de la República Argentina, la autoridad que expide el presente pasaporte ruega y solicita a todos aquellos a quienes puede concernir, dejen pasar libremente a su titular y prestarle la asistencia y protección necesaria.

In English:
The Government of the República Argentina hereby requests all whom it may concern, to permit the bearer to pass without delay or hindrance and in case of need, to give all lawful aid and protection.

In Portuguese:
Em nome do Governo da República Argentina, a autoridade que concede o presente passaporte roga e solicita às autoridades competentes, deixar passar livremente o titular e prestar-lhe toda a assistência e proteção necessária.

In French:
Au nom du Gouvernement de la République Argentine, l'autorité qui délivre le présent passeport demande à tous ceux qui pourraient être concernés, de laisser passer librement son titulaire et lui prêter l'assistance et la protection nécessaire.

Other types of passport 

The Argentine Ministry of Foreign Affairs also issues diplomatic passports (blue-covered) to Argentine diplomats accredited overseas and their eligible dependents, and to citizens who reside in Argentina and travel abroad for diplomatic work. The Ministry also issues official passports (blue-covered) to Government employees assigned overseas, either permanently or temporarily, and their eligible dependents, and to members of Congress who travel abroad on official affairs.

Under special circumstances, if a woman is stateless but married to an Argentine citizen, the Federal Police will issue a Pasaporte de Esposa de Argentino (Argentine wife's passport) in order to leave the country. The same applies for persons under the age of 18 who were adopted by Argentine parents.

See also
Documento Nacional de Identidad (Argentina)
List of passports
Visa requirements for Argentine citizens
Visa policy of Argentina

References

External links

 Documentación Personal - Policía Federal Argentina
 Decreto PEN Nº 2015/66 - Reglamento de Documentos de Identidad y de Viaje
Images of a well-travelled 1965 Argentine passport from www.passportland.com

Argentina
Government of Argentina
Mercosur passports